Raaz may refer to:

Films
 Raaz (1967 film), an Indian romantic thriller directed by Ravindra Dave
 Raaz (1981 film), an Indian film starring Raj Babbar
 Raaz (film series), an Indian horror series produced by Mahesh and Mukesh Bhatt
 Raaz (2002 film), directed by Vikram Bhatt
 Raaz: The Mystery Continues, 2009 film directed by Mohit Suri
 Raaz 3D, 2012 sequel directed by Vikram Bhatt
 Raaz: Reboot, 2016 sequel directed by Vikram Bhatt

People
 Raaz Chandpuri (1892–1969), Indian writer
 Vijay Raaz (born 1963), Indian actor

See also
 Raz (disambiguation)
 Raas (disambiguation)